The Hessentag is an annual event, both fair and festival, organized by the German state of Hesse to represent the different regions of Hesse. The events are shown for a week to the visitors, with an emphasis on cultural displays and exhibitions. It is the oldest and largest state festival (Landesfest) in Germany.

History

The Hessentag was launched in 1961 by the prime minister of Hesse, Georg August Zinn. The event was intended to bring together long-time residents and migrants and to provide a sense of their new home to the many refugees and displaced persons. Hesse itself had to catch up in terms of togetherness; the state was only created in 1945 by a decision of the victorious powers of World War II, from areas with different history and development. Georg August Zinn knew how to integrate the various new "Hessians", following his motto: "Hesse ist, wer Hesse sein will" (A Hessian is anybody who wants to be a Hessian").

The first Hessentag in Alsfeld in 1961 was held on three days, presenting a fair and a parade of the different traditional costumes in Hesse. It attracted 40.000 visitors. Because of this success, an annual event was held. The Hessentag is hosted by a different town each year. The event comes with publicity, improved infrastructure and restoration of historic buildings, but is expensive for the host town.

Hessentag has undergone many changes. Originally it was held on one weekend (three days), but grew to a week, including both weekends. It connects Hessian culture, tradition and modern lifestyle. The first focus of the event was presentation of traditions, especially the wide variety of costumes in Hesse and also the costumes of the new citizens who came after 1945. Concerts by international pop groups have become a featured part of the program. The Landesausstellung (State Exhibition) is shown in mobile halls, presenting the state government, the parliament, parliamentary groups, various state agencies and organizations, associations and clubs. Regions of Hesse are presented mostly from a tourist's point of view. Since 1971, for each Hessentag a couple (Hessentagspaar) is elected to represent it. Since 1993, a motto for the event was chosen by the hosting town, also a logo. The event is traditionally closed by a parade.

Each year the event has attracted more than half a million visitors, not only from Hesse. More than one million visitors were counted first in Baunatal in 1999, the leader so far was Kassel, with nearly 1.9 million visitors in 2013. Other towns attracting more than one million visitors were Dietzenbach (2001), Butzbach (2007), Langenselbold (2009), Stadtallendorf (2010) and Oberursel (2011). The Hessentag 2012 was held in Wetzlar and attracted 1.2 million visitors.

In 2020, the scheduled Hessentag in Bad Vilbel was cancelled for the first time due to the COVID-19 pandemic. The 2021 Hessentag, scheduled to be held in Fulda, was also cancelled, as was the 2022 edition, scheduled to be held in Haiger.

Locations

Planned locations

References

External links

 Ministerpräsident Volker Bouffier: „Tradition des Hessentags mit Herzlichkeit und Offenheit gelebt“ (Prime Minister Volker Bouffier: "Tradition of Hessentags lived with friendliness and openness"), press release of Hessische Staatskanzlei, 10 June 2012 
 250.000 Besucher auf hr-Veranstaltungen Hessischer Rundfunk 
 Hessentag 2012 in Wetzlar Frankfurter Rundschau 
Von guten Stuten und feinen Schweinen  FAZ 8 June 2012 
 Fast eine halbe Million Besucher bei Hessentag Faz 6 June 2012 

Cultural festivals in Germany
Festivals in Germany
1961 establishments in West Germany
Festivals established in 1961